Shri Arjun Lal Sethi (9 September 1880 – 22 December 1941) was a freedom fighter, revolutionary, and educator from Jaipur. He is sometimes termed the father of the freedom movement in Rajasthan. He was the founder of the Congress party in Rajasthan  and the Jaipur Praja Mandal

Background
Arjun Lai Sethi was born at Jaipur. His grandfather  Bhawani Das Sethi, a rich businessman, lived in Baidwara in Delhi. His son Jawahar Lal Sethi, father of  Arjun Lai, was born of his second wife and was married to Pancho Devi, daughter of Mohan Lai Nazim, who held the rank of District Magistrate of Jaipur.  Bhawani Das was friendly with the Mughal princes.  His vast business was mainly looked after by his employees, and he, compelled by intuitions to leave Delhi, had later settled at Jaipur.

Arjun Lai Sethi earned his B.A. in Persian in 1902. Very well versed in English, Persian, Arabic, Sanskrit, Pali, and Jain philosophy, he was an excellent writer and poet as. A fluent and impressive speaker on politics and Jain philosophy, he used to speak to the spell-bound audience for hours.  He strongly advocated  respect for all religions and castes, and the study of Gita.

Involvement in India's freedom movement
From a very young age, he had actively plunged himself into national movements for freedom of India.  In 1907, he established Vardhaman Jain Vidyalaya, which became an important  center of independence activists. Besides religious education, the students were steeped with revolutionary and political ideology. A Shikshan Samiti, which he established, had its network of Pathshalas in Jaipur.

He worked as Kamdar in Jaipur State, but soon left the service, distressed with the behavior of the English with the Indian people. Independence-minded Arjun Lai Sethi answered the call of his heart to serve the country. He was an active participant in revolutionary movements between the years 1905–12. While serving as Head Master of Kalyanmal Mahavidyalaya at Indore, he was arrested and was kept in custody for six years, until 1922, at Jaipur and Vellore.

A large number of daily newspapers from various provinces, and senior leaders had initiated movements for his release. Dr. Annie Besant, among others, met the Viceroy for this purpose. As he had taken a vow not to consume food without worshiping Jain Tirthankar's idol, he fasted in the jail for seventy days, and broke fast only when Mahatma Bhagwan Din was successful in having the idol brought there, a unique occurrence in the history of jails.

One of his revolutionary cohorts, Moti Chand Jain, from Maharashtra, was sentenced to death.  Shri Sethi had married one of the daughters, out of the three sons and three daughters from his wife Gulab Devi, to Maharashtrian Brahmin.

His son Prakash was on his death bed in 1923, at the young age of twenty-five. Shri Sethi received a telegram urging him to journey to Jodhpur immediately. Simultaneously, he received a telegram from Pt. Sunder Lal, requesting he travel to Bombay to address a meeting. The bonds of affection could not dissuade his dutiful mind, and he hastened to Bombay.

Before the start of his lecture he received the telegram informing him of the death of Prakash. Unperturbed outwardly, he gave his lecture, to the great surprise and mixed sorrow of the large audience which was aware of the sad demise.

Hardships
He had truly dedicated his life to the service of his country, plunging his family into great financial difficulties. Senior political leaders, including Bal Gangadhar Tilak, Mahatma Gandhi, Jawahar Lai Nehru, and Netaji Subhash Chandra Bose consulted him on important matters. Mahatma Gandhi had visited his house on 5 July 1934 to insist on his to re-entry into national movements.

He was elected President of Rajputana and Madhya Bharat Congress Committee on Sept 9, 1934, position he did not long hold, due to the divisions within the party. He had delivered his last lecture on 'Jainism and Socialism’ at Biawar or 13 Aug 1939. He expired at Ajmer on 22 December 1941, at the age of sixty-one.

He was unwilling to compromise. He had squandered his ancestral wealth and was unable to earn a living to support a large family. In a letter to his friend, he acknowledge his financial and mental distress. He spent last few months of his life at Ajmer and passed away there at his friend's residence. His family learned only after his death that he passed away at Ajmer and was buried there as per his last wish. His grave is located beside his friend Syed Abdul Aziz at a hill near Anasagar lake whose nephew S.A Raoof son of S.A Quddus (Advocate) also served as an Additional Collector & District Magistrate of both Ajmer and Jaipur.

Legacy

India became independent in 1947. In 1949, the Jaipur state joined the independent India.

In 1952 he was included among the pioneers of modern Jain awakening in Jain Jagran ke Agradut published by Bharatiya Janapitha.

A large new colony in Jaipur has been named Arjun Lai Sethi Nagar to memorial to the patriotic and learned leader.  Today, on 9 September 2017, his statue is being placed in Sethi Colony Public Park, and the park is being renamed "Pt. Arjun lal sethi udhayan." .

Elder son Mr. Prakesh chand sethi, ninety-seven, is a great educator, living in Sethi colony Jaipur. The younger son, Dr. Jagat Prakash Sethi, was a senior physician in Sawai Man Singh Hospital Jaipur.

See also
 Narayan Hari Apte
 Kesari Singh Barahath

References

Taken from Article on Encyclopedia of Jainism
 Memories  from his son compiled by Vikas sethi

20th-century Indian politicians
1880 births
1941 deaths
Politicians from British India